Lophoplusia psectrocera is a moth of the family Noctuidae. It was first described by George Hampson in 1913. It is endemic to the Hawaiian island of Maui.

External links

Plusiinae
Endemic moths of Hawaii